The 1907–08 Chicago Maroons men's basketball team represented the University of Chicago in intercollegiate basketball during the 1907–08 season. The team finished the season with a 23–2 record and were named national champions by the Helms Athletic Foundation. This was the second straight year that Chicago claimed the Helms national championship. The team played their home games on campus at Frank Dickinson Bartlett Gymnasium.

Both Pat Page and John Schommer were named All-Americans. For Schommer, it was his third consecutive All-American honor; for Page, it was his second.

Championship
For the first time in college basketball's short history, a true national championship was awarded based on a "best-of-three" playoff series played by the presumptuous best two teams in the nation. In order to get to this series, however, the Maroons had to win the Western Conference. Based on the fact the Maroons and the Wisconsin Badgers had split the two games  during the regular season, Coach Raycroft and Wisconsin physical education director Charles P. Hutchins agreed that a title game needed to be played. The game was played in Madison, however, the Maroons came out victorious and were not only awarded the conference title, this also determined who would meet the Quakers of Pennsylvania.

It would only take two games for the Maroons to win the series. The first game was played at Bartlett Gymnasium with a final score of 21 to 18. The second game was played in Philadelphia with a final score of 18 to 16. 
Besides the fact that a series of games were played to determine a national champion, the Maroons proved that they were worthy of the title by defeating 23 of the 25 opponents they faced during the season. Meanwhile, with a season that included over 20 games, Pennsylvania met and defeated all of the teams they faced in the east.

Roster

Head Coach: Joseph Raycroft (2nd year at Chicago)

Schedule
Source									

|-	

|- align="center" bgcolor=""

|- align="center" bgcolor=""

	

	

|- align="center" bgcolor=""

	

	

|- align="center" bgcolor=""

|-

Player stats

References

External links
 

Chicago Maroons men's basketball seasons
NCAA Division I men's basketball tournament championship seasons
Chicago
Chicago Maroons Men's Basketball Team
Chicago Maroons Men's Basketball Team